Lake Mary is a census-designated place and unincorporated area in Orange County, Florida, United States. The population was 1,575 at the 2010 census. It is part of the Orlando–Kissimmee Metropolitan Statistical Area.

Demographics

Census
The community is located on the east shore of the lake of the same name. The CDP was newly defined for the 2010 census.

Lake 
Lake Mary is the namesake of the census-dedicated area. It is large body of water that is part of the Lake Hart watershed, which includes nearby Lake Hart, Lake Whippoorwill, and Lake Nona. There are 3 notable parks and nature reserves bordering the lake. Isle of Pine reserve on the south-eastern portion, Moss Park on the western portion, and Split Oak Forest on the south-western. These lakes are interconnected through a series of canals.

Some notable local wildlife endemic to the area includes but is not limited to animals such as the american alligator, Florida softshell turtle, Florida sand hill cranes, and Florida scrub jays.

History 
As early as 2013, reports of the invasive apple snail occurred. The species is now established itself within the greater Lake Hart watershed.

In September 2017, strong winds from Hurricane Irma swept over Florida, causing major disruption to Lake Mary. As a result, the island in the northwestern portion of lake known colloquially as Bird Island had the northernmost portion split by winds. The split portion moved northwards and is now a small separate floating island, known by locals as Yoshi Island. In addition, nearby houses, and recreation institutions such as SORA Rowing (South Orlando Rowing Association) suffered heavy damage to their facilities.

In 2020, the developer Tavistock and the local governing bodies of Orange County and Osceola county, approved to destroy a significant portion of the nearby protected forest land, Split Oak Forest, for new roads and housing communities. This protected forest land is home to threatened and endemic species such as the Gopher Tortoise and Florida scrub jay.

Recreation 
Lake Mary is lined with private homes alongside its banks often with docks leading out into 3–12 ft water. Popular activities in the Florida lake include fishing, watersports like wakeboarding or tubing, jetskiing, rowing, kayaking, and swimming.

Moss Park is a popular area for nature hikes, picnics, swimming, or as an entry point for watercraft.

The SORA Rowing team (South Orlando Rowing Association) is an established rowing organization of middle school, high school, and adult rowers who compete in a variety of local, state, and national events. Their facilities located within Moss Park include a boathouse, docks, and equipment for the rowers.

References

Unincorporated communities in Orange County, Florida
Census-designated places in Orange County, Florida
Greater Orlando
Census-designated places in Florida
Unincorporated communities in Florida